Acropora samoensis is a species of acroporid coral found in the Red Sea, the Gulf of Aden, the southwest and northern Indian Ocean, the central Indo-Pacific, Australia, Southeast Asia, Japan, the East China Sea and the oceanic west and central Pacific Ocean. It was described by Brook in 1891.

Description
Its branches taper slightly towards the ends and are curved. Its axial corallites have diameters at least double the size of its radial corallites and are dome-shaped; its radial corallites are tube-shaped. It is blue, cream, or purple in colour, and looks similar to Acropora torresiana.

Distribution
It is classed as a least concern species on the IUCN Red List, but it is believed that its population is decreasing, and it is listed under Appendix II of CITES. Figures of its population are unknown, but is likely to be threatened by the global reduction of coral reefs, the increase of temperature causing coral bleaching, climate change, human activity, the crown-of-thorns starfish (Acanthaster planci) and disease. It occurs in the Red Sea, the Gulf of Aden, the southwest and northern Indian Ocean, the central Indo-Pacific, Australia, Southeast Asia, Japan, the East China Sea and the oceanic west and central Pacific Ocean.

Taxonomy
It was described as Madrepora samoensis by Brook in 1891.

References

Acropora
Cnidarians of the Pacific Ocean
Fauna of the Indian Ocean
Fauna of the Red Sea
Marine fauna of Africa
Marine fauna of Asia
Marine fauna of Oceania
Corals described in 1891